Shadow Hunter may refer to:
Shadow Hunter (TV series), a Canadian television show
Shadow Hunter (comic), a comic book series from Virgin Comics
Darth Maul: Shadow Hunter, a 2001 novel set in the Star Wars galaxy
Shadow Hunter, a 1990 album by Davy Spillane

See also
Shadowhunters, an American television series based on The Mortal Instruments
Shadow Hunters, a Japanese board game